Red Earth Creek is a hamlet in Alberta, Canada within the Municipal District of Opportunity No. 17.

This hamlet is in Census Division No. 17 and in the federal riding of Fort McMurray-Athabasca. It is also the administrative centre of the Loon River First Nation reserve.

Demographics 

Climate

See also 
List of communities in Alberta
List of designated places in Alberta
List of hamlets in Alberta

References 

Hamlets in Alberta
Designated places in Alberta
Municipal District of Opportunity No. 17